Bozhurtsi is a village in Chernoochene Municipality, in Kardzhali Province, in southern-central Bulgaria. It covers an area of 2.106 square kilometres and as of 2007 it had a population of 258 people.

References

Villages in Kardzhali Province